Chas William McFarland (born November 1, 1986) is an American former professional basketball player for the Akita Northern Happinets of the Japanese bj league. The 7-footer was the tallest Happinets player and took over the "air supremacy". He was kicked in head by Niigata forward Rodney Webb and broke his nose in March 2014.

College statistics

|-
| style="text-align:left;"| 2006-07
| style="text-align:left;"| Wake Forest
| 15 || 0 || 5.4 || .286 || 1.000 || .333|| 1.6 ||0.5 || 0.1 ||0.1 || 0.7
|-
| style="text-align:left;"| 2007-08
| style="text-align:left;"| Wake Forest
| 30 || 27 || 21.5 || .490 || .182 || .659|| 5.8 ||0.4  || 0.5 || 1.6 || 8.4
|-
| style="text-align:left;"| 2008-09
| style="text-align:left;"| Wake Forest
| 31 || 29 || 20.4 || .522 || .000 || .722|| 5.8 ||0.5  || 0.6 || 0.9 || 8.7
|-
| style="text-align:left;"| 2009-10
| style="text-align:left;"| Wake Forest
| 31 || 25 || 24.6 || .446 || .000 || .600|| 7.0 ||0.8 || 0.5 || 1.2 || 7.2
|-
|- class="sortbottom"
! style="text-align:center;" colspan=2| Career
! 107 || 81 || 19.8 || .482 || .158 || .653 || 5.6 ||0.6 ||0.4 || 1.1 || 7.1

Playoffs

|-
| style="text-align:left;"| 2009-10
| style="text-align:left;"| Wake Forest
| 2 ||   || 20.5 || .444 || .000 || .600|| 5.0 ||1.5 || 0.0 ||0.5|| 5.5
|-

NCAA Special Events Stats

|-
| style="text-align:left;"| 2010
| style="text-align:left;"| Portsmouth Invitational Tournament
| 3 ||   || 20.00 || .533 || .000 || .000|| 6 ||1.3 || 0.3 ||1.3 || 5.3
|-

Career statistics

NBA Stats 

|-
| align="left" | 2010-11
| align="left" | HOU
|  2||0  ||2.8  ||.333  ||.000  ||.000  || 0.50 || 0.00 || 0.00 || 0.00 ||1.00
|-

Regular season 

|-
| align="left" | 2010-11
| align="left" | SPG
|  26||21  ||22.5  ||.525  ||.000  ||.747  || 5.77 || 1.08 || 0.46 || 1.00 ||10.5
|-
|-
| align="left" | 2011-12
| align="left" | Yokohama
|  49||39  ||23.2  ||.491  ||.000  ||.692  || 8.7 || 1.1 || 0.8 || 1.3 ||9.9
|-
| align="left" | 2012-13
| align="left" | SPG/TEX
|  19||4  ||10.5  ||.417  ||.000  ||.625  || 2.79 || 0.42 || 0.42 || 0.21 ||3.42
|-
| align="left" |  2013-14
| align="left" | Akita
| 47 ||  || 23.7 || .532 || .000 || .675 || 8.0 || 2.5 || 0.8 || 1.3 || 11.9
|-

G League Awards & Honors
All-Rookie 2nd Team - 2011

Playoffs 

|-
|style="text-align:left;"|2011-12
|style="text-align:left;"|Yokohama
| 4 ||  ||18.3  || .524   || .000 || .722 ||7.3 ||0.8 ||0.0|| 0.8 ||8.8
|-
|style="text-align:left;"|2013-14
|style="text-align:left;"|Akita
| 6 || 6 ||20.83  || .690   || .000 || .826 ||6.17 ||1.83 ||1.67|| 0.83 ||12.83
|-

Trivia
Chas Burger is sold at the shop named Nakadori Satisfaction in Akita.

References

External links
 Wake Forest Demon Deacons bio
 
 Chas McFarland on YouTube

1986 births
Living people
Akita Northern Happinets players
American expatriate basketball people in Japan
American expatriate basketball people in Uruguay
American men's basketball players
Basketball players from Illinois
Centers (basketball)
People from Bay City, Texas
Springfield Armor players
Texas Legends players
Wake Forest Demon Deacons men's basketball players
Yokohama B-Corsairs players